Lactobacillus gasseri is a species in the genus Lactobacillus identified in 1980 by François Gasser and his associates. It is part of the vaginal flora. Its genome has been sequenced. L. gasseri is a  normal inhabitant of the lower reproductive tract in healthy women. It also produces Lactocillin.

Lactobacillus gasseri produces gassericin A, a bacteriocin.

References

Further reading

External links

LPSN
Type strain of Lactobacillus gasseri at BacDive -  the Bacterial Diversity Metadatabase

Lactobacillaceae
Bacteria described in 1980